Cronjager is a surname, notable people with this name include:

 Edward Cronjager (1904 – 1960), American cinematographer
 Henry Cronjager (1877 – 1967), American cinematographer, father of Edward Cronjager
 Henry Cronjager Jr., American cinematographer, brother of Edward Cronjager and son of Henry Cronjager
 Jules Cronjager, American cinematographer, brother of Henry Cronjager